Myrceugenia campestris is a species of plant in the family Myrtaceae. It is endemic to Brazil.

References

campestris
Endemic flora of Brazil
Vulnerable flora of South America
Taxonomy articles created by Polbot